Aldea Epulef  is a village and municipality in the Languiñeo Department of Chubut Province in southern Argentina.The population of the municipality grew from 150, in the 2001 census, to 251 in the 2011 census.

References

Populated places in Chubut Province